Ma Nam Wat is a village in the Hebe Haven area of Sai Kung District, Hong Kong. It is located on the Pak Sha Wan Peninsula aka. Ma Nam Wat Peninsula.

Administration
Ma Nam Wat is a recognized village under the New Territories Small House Policy.

Features
A section of the waters offshore of Ma Nam Wat is one of the 26 designated marine fish culture zones in Hong Kong.

References

External links

 Delineation of area of existing village Ma Nam Wat (Sai Kung) for election of resident representative (2019 to 2022)

Villages in Sai Kung District, Hong Kong